Katherine (Katie) Hinde is an Associate Professor of Evolutionary Biology and Senior Sustainability Scientist at Arizona State University, where she researches lactation. She is also a science writer and science communicator.

Education 
Hinde attended Seattle Central College and was part of the Running Start and College Transfer programs. She earned a bachelor's of arts in anthropology from the University of Washington in 1999. She joined University of California, Los Angeles for her doctoral studies, where she was awarded the Chancellor’s Dissertation Fellowship in 2007. She completed her PhD at UCLA in 2008.

Career 
Hinde served as a postdoctoral scholar in Neuroscience in the Brain, Mind, and Behavior Unit of California National Primate Research Center at UC Davis until 2009. She joined Harvard University as an Assistant Professor in 2011, where she remained until 2015.

Hinde is now the Director of the Comparative Lactation Lab at Arizona State University. Here she investigates the hormones, food and medicine contained within mother's milk. She argues that we know twice as much about erectile dysfunction than we do about breast milk. Hinde identified that the combination of fat, protein, mineral, sugar, bacteria and hormones contained within mother's milk are equivalent to fingerprints and influence infant outcomes from postnatal life to adulthood. Human breast milk contains oligosaccharides, of which there are more than 200 varieties. These cannot be digested by babies, but instead provide the right community of microbes to prevent pathogens from establishing. Hinde identified that the milk of young monkey mothers contained fewer calories but more of the stress hormone cortisol than that of their older counterparts. She found that more cortisol contributes to infants that are more active and playful, as well as infants who are better at coping in stressful situations.

She is recognised as a young researcher who has made outstanding, original scientific contributions to the study of human milk. Hinde is a member of the Executive Council of the International Society for Research in Human Milk and Lactation. Her research has been featured in National Geographic, Slate (magazine), Science News, The Washington Times and The New York Times. She speaks regularly at international conferences.

Public engagement 
In 2011 Hinde began the popular science blog "Mammals Suck ... Milk!", which has since had over one million views. She is associate editor of Splash! Milk Science Update. She created Mammal March Madness in 2013, a month of science outreach events used in classrooms across America. In 2014 she wrote Building Babies. She appeared on the Center for Academic Research and Training in Anthropogeny YouTube channel, discussing Childrearing in Human Evolution. She was a guest on the comedy show "You're the Expert" with Wyatt Cenac. In 2016 Hinde was named the Milk Maven in GRIST 50, an annual list of innovators who are working toward a more sustainable future. She part of the SAFE13 study, which looks to expose how widespread sexual harassment and assault are in scientific fieldwork. In 2017 Hinde delivered a TED talk What we don't know about mother's milk. She was recently featured in the Netflix docuseries, "Babies."

Awards 
2016 – Ehrlich-Koldovsky Early Career Award, International Society for Research in Human Milk & Lactation

2016 – Sustainability Innovators, Organizers, & Visionaries #Grist50 Grist Magazine

2014 – Early Career Achievement Award, American Society of Primatologists

2014 – Distinguished Alumni Award, Seattle Central College

2013 – Most Valuable Presentation Award 10th Annual Milk Genomics and Human Health Meeting

References 

Evolutionary biologists
American women anthropologists
University of California, Los Angeles alumni
University of Washington College of Arts and Sciences alumni
Women science writers
American science writers
Science communicators
21st-century American anthropologists
21st-century American women writers
21st-century American non-fiction writers
21st-century American scientists
21st-century biologists
21st-century American women scientists
American women biologists
American women non-fiction writers